The Memphis Rockers were a professional basketball franchise based in Memphis, Tennessee from 1990-1991. The team played its inaugural seasons in the World Basketball League before folding.

John Starks played for the team before becoming an NBA All-Star. Other notable players: Vincent Askew, Andre Turner, David Rivers, and Joe Dawson.

The Rockers played their home games at the Mid-South Coliseum.

References

World Basketball League teams
Basketball teams in Tennessee